Stonegate Securities Ltd v Gregory [1980] Ch 576 is a UK insolvency law case concerning the liquidation procedure when a company is unable to repay its debts. It held that a winding up petition would not be granted to a petitioner to whom a debt was bona fide under dispute.

Facts
Mr Gregory in accordance with Companies Act 1948, section 223 (now Insolvency Act 1986, section 123) served a notice demanding payment of a £33,000 debt within 21 days. Stonegate had agreed to buy shares in Mr Gregory’s property company, Trinette Ltd, when it got planning permission. The company accepted there was a contingent or prospective liability, but argued the debt was not presently due. At the first instance Mr Gregory accepted that there was a dispute about when the debt was due, and insofar as the debt was contingent, that the contingency might never happen at all. The company sought interlocutory relief restraining the petition.

Blackett-Ord VC found there was a bona fide dispute about whether Mr Gregory was a creditor for a sum presently due and granted the injunction, provided that in three weeks the company would make a declaration of solvency. The company appealed.

Judgment
Buckley LJ held that Insolvency Act 1986, section 122 had ‘no application to a case in which the creditor is a creditor in respect of a sum which is not presently due…’ The claim by Mr Gregory had to fail because ‘if the company in good faith and on substantial grounds disputes any liability in respect of the alleged debt, the petition will be dismissed or, if the matter is brought before a court before the petition is issued, its presentation will in normal circumstances be restrained.’

Goff LJ and Sir David Cairns concurred.

See also

UK insolvency law

Notes

References
L Sealy and S Worthington, Cases and Materials in Company Law (9th edn OUP 2010)
R Goode, Principles of Corporate Insolvency Law (4th edn Sweet & Maxwell 2011)

United Kingdom insolvency case law
Court of Appeal (England and Wales) cases
1980 in case law
1980 in British law